Lorenzo Licitra (born 25 September 1992) is an Italian singer, best known for winning the eleventh season of the Italian talent show X Factor in 2017. His debut single, "In the Name of Love", was released on 24 November 2017.

Discography

Extended plays

Singles

References

1991 births
21st-century Italian male  singers
Italian pop singers
Living people
The X Factor winners
X Factor (Italian TV series) contestants
People from Ragusa, Sicily
Musicians from the Province of Ragusa
Italian LGBT singers